The Dixie League was a Class C level baseball league formed in 1933, with teams based in the US states of Louisiana, Texas, Mississippi, and Arkansas.

History
The 1933 eight–team Dixie League was under the direction of president J. Alvin Gardner. The Baton Rouge Solons won the 1933 league championship. After one season of competition, the Dixie League was split into the East Dixie League and West Dixie League, with both leagues competing in the 1934 and 1935 seasons.

Standings & statistics

1933 Dixie League
schedule
Waco (24–38) moved to Pine Bluff June 27. The franchise folded August 22. The six cancelled games were awarded to their opponents.Playoffs: Baton Rouge 4 games, Shreveport 2, one tie.

References

 
Defunct minor baseball leagues in the United States
Baseball leagues in Arkansas
Baseball leagues in Louisiana
Baseball leagues in Mississippi
Baseball leagues in Texas
Sports leagues established in 1933
1933 establishments in the United States
1933 disestablishments in the United States